Vilken härlig dag is a studio album from Swedish dansband Lotta Engbergs, released on 18 September 2000. The album was more singer-songwriter-inspired than earlier albums, and it was the last album from Lotta Engbergs. The album peaked at 17th place on the Swedish album chart. It was also the last Lotta Engbergs album before the band disbanded in 2002.

Track listing

Contributing musicians
Lotta Engberg, song
Peter Ljung, piano
Lasse Wellander, guitar
Prem Sandell, percussion instruments
Pernilla Emme, song

Hits
Many of the songs from the album was tested for the hit list Svensktoppen.

Blå, blå är himmelen
Blå, blå är himmelen, written by Steve Eriksson, failed on 25 August 2001 to enter Svensktoppen.

Brinner för dig
Brinner för dig was on Svensktoppen for two rounds, 2 December 2000 (7th) and 9 December 2000 (8th).

En liten stund på Jorden
The biggest hit from the album was the ballad-inspired En liten stund på Jorden, which during its 12 rounds long visit on Svensktoppen from 10 June to 25 August 2000, at best was placed 5th, which happened on 29 July 2000. En liten stund på Jorden was written by Christer Lundh and Mikael Wendt, and a theme in the song is walking in the forest.

Vilken härlig dag
Vilken härlig dag is also the first track on the album. The song Vilken härlig dag is about summer and was written by Torgny Söderberg.  On 3 February 2001 Vilken härlig dag achieved 10th place at Svensktoppen, and on 10 February 2001 it reached 9th place. Then it was knocked out from Svensktoppen.

Chart positions

References

2000 albums
2000 songs